This is a timeline of HIV/AIDS, including cases before 1980.

Pre-1980s

Researchers estimate that some time in the early 20th century, a form of Simian immunodeficiency virus found in chimpanzees (SIVcpz) first entered humans in Central Africa and began circulating in Léopoldville (modern-day Kinshasa) by the 1920s. This gave rise to the pandemic form of HIV (HIV-1 group M); other zoonotic transmissions led to the other, less prevalent, subtypes of HIV.

1930s to 1950s
 A range of small scale Pneumocystis pneumonia epidemics occurred in northern and central European countries between the 1930s and 1950s, affecting children who were prematurely born. The epidemics spread likely due to infected glass syringes and needles. Malnutrition was not considered a cause, especially because the epidemics were at their height in the 1950s. At that time war torn Europe had already recovered from devastation. Researchers state that the most likely cause was a retrovirus closely related to HIV (or a mild version of HIV) brought to Europe and originating from Cameroon, a former German colony. The epidemic started in the Free City of Danzig in 1939 and then spread to nearby countries in the 1940s and 1950s, like Switzerland and The Netherlands.

1959

 The first known case of :HIV in a human occurs in a man who died in the Congo, later confirmed as having HIV infection (from his preserved blood samples).
 June 28, in New York City, Ardouin Antonio, a 49-year-old Haitian shipping clerk dies of Pneumocystis carinii pneumonia, a disease closely associated with AIDS. Gordon Hennigar, who performed the postmortem examination of the man's body, found "the first reported instance of unassociated Pneumocystis carinii disease in an adult" to be so unusual that he preserved Ardouin's lungs for later study. The case was published in two medical journals at the time, and Hennigar has been quoted in numerous publications saying that he believes Ardouin probably had AIDS.

1960s
 HIV-2, a viral variant found in West Africa, is thought to have transferred to people from sooty mangabey monkeys in Guinea-Bissau.
 Genetic studies of the virus indicate that HIV-1 (M) first arrived in the Americas in the late 1960s likely in Haiti or another Caribbean island. At this time, many Haitians were working in Congo, providing the opportunity for infection.

1964
 Jerome Horwitz of Barbara Ann Karmanos Cancer Institute and Wayne State University School of Medicine synthesizes AZT under a grant from the US National Institutes of Health (NIH). AZT was originally intended as an anticancer drug.

1966
 Williams and Williams speculate that the abundant cases of Kaposi's sarcoma observed in equatorial Africa are due to an unknown disease. Numerous incidences of fatal cases of Kaposi's Sarcoma and Hodgkin's Lymphoma (including cases in children indicative of vertical transmission), typical of HIV/AIDS infection, are reported across Africa beginning in the 1950s and increasing in the 1960s.

1968
 A 2003 analysis of HIV types found in the United States, compared to known mutation rates, suggests that the virus may have first arrived in the United States in this year. The disease spread from the 1966 American strain, but remained unrecognized for another 12 years. This is, however, contradicted by the estimated area of time of initial infection of Robert Rayford who was most likely infected around 1959.

1969
 A St. Louis teenager, identified as Robert Rayford, dies of an illness that baffles his doctors. Eighteen years later, molecular biologists at Tulane University in New Orleans test samples of his remains and find evidence of HIV.

1976
 The 9-year-old daughter of Arvid Noe dies in January. Noe, a Norwegian sailor, dies in April; his wife dies in December. Later it is determined that Noe contracted HIV-1 type O, in Africa during the early 1960s.

1977
 Danish physician Grethe Rask dies of AIDS contracted in Africa.
 A San Francisco woman, believed to be a sex-worker, gives birth to the first of three children who are later diagnosed with AIDS. The children's blood was tested after their deaths and revealed an HIV infection. The mother died of AIDS in May 1987. Test results show she was infected no later than 1977.
 French-Canadian flight attendant Gaëtan Dugas, a relatively early HIV patient, gets legally married in Los Angeles to get U.S. citizenship. He stays in Silver Lake whenever he is in town.
 In 1977 a Zairian woman in her 30s seeks treatment in Belgium for symptoms indicating a suppressed immune system and AIDS-like disease (rapid weight loss, swollen lymph nodes and severe  CMV). She initially came to Belgium for care of the oral fungus infection of her baby daughter. Her two other children, who were recently born as well, had earlier died from respiratory infections; both also had an oral fungus infection since birth. The woman contracts even more opportunistic infections, dying in Kinshasha in early 1978. Tissue and blood samples are not preserved, but researchers state this might be an early AIDS case.

1978
 A Portuguese man known as Senhor José (English: Mr. Joseph) dies; he will later be confirmed as the first known infection of HIV-2. It is believed that he was exposed to the disease in Guinea-Bissau in 1966.

1979
 An early case of AIDS in the United States was in a female baby born in New Jersey in 1973 or 1974. She was born to a sixteen-year-old girl, an identified drug-injector, who had previously had multiple male sexual partners. The child died in 1979 at the age of five. Subsequent testing on her stored tissues confirmed that she had contracted HIV-1.
 A thirty-year-old woman from the Dominican Republic dies at Mount Sinai Medical Center in New York City from CMV infection.
 A Greek man who worked for years as a fisherman at Congo's Lake Tanganyika shows up in a Belgian hospital with a range of untreatable opportunistic infections, including a very rare fungal meningitis. After he dies, the hospital keeps his blood and tissue samples for future analysis. After HIV testing becomes available, his samples are tested for HIV and give a positive result.

1980s
1980
 April 24, San Francisco resident (and supposed gay sex worker) Ken Horne is reported to the Center for Disease Control with Kaposi's sarcoma (KS). Later in 1981, the CDC would retroactively identify him as the first patient of the AIDS epidemic in the US. He also had Cryptococcus.
 A 36-year-old Danish homosexual male dies in the Rigshospitalet in Copenhagen from Pneumocystis pneumonia.
 October 31, Gaëtan Dugas pays his first known visit to New York City bathhouses. He would later be incorrectly deemed "Patient Zero" for his supposed connection to many early cases of AIDS in the United States.
 December 23, Rick Wellikoff, a Brooklyn schoolteacher, dies of AIDS in New York City. He is the fourth US citizen known to die from the illness.
 A Zairian woman and a French woman die in late 1980 of Pneumocystis pneumonia in the Claude Bernard Hospital in Paris.

1981

 May 18, Lawrence Mass becomes the first journalist in the world to write about the epidemic, in the New York Native, a gay newspaper. A gay tipster overheard his physician mention that some gay men were being treated in intensive-care units in New York City for a strange pneumonia. "Disease Rumors Largely Unfounded" was the headline of Mass' article. Mass repeated a New York City public-health official's claims that there was no wave of disease sweeping through the gay community. At this point, however, the Centers for Disease Control (CDC) had been gathering information for about a month on the outbreak that Mass' source dismissed.
 June 5, The CDC reports a cluster of Pneumocystis pneumonia in five gay men in Los Angeles.
 July 3, An article in The New York Times carries the headline: "Rare Cancer Seen in 41 Homosexuals". The article describes cases of Kaposi's sarcoma found in forty-one gay men in New York City and San Francisco. The CDC reports clusters of Kaposi's sarcoma and Pneumocystis pneumonia among gay men in California and New York City.
 October, self proclaimed "AIDS poster boy" Bobbi Campbell is diagnosed with Kaposi's sarcoma in San Francisco. That same month he creates and displays San Francisco's first AIDS poster.
 October, first reported case in Spain, a 35-year-old gay man. Died shortly after.
 October 29, John Eaddie, 49, dies of pneumocystis pneumonia in London. Later identified as HIV.
 December 10, Bobbi Campbell is the first to come out publicly as a person with what came to be known as AIDS.
 December 12, First known case reported in the United Kingdom.
 One of the first reported patients to have died of AIDS (presumptive diagnosis) in the US is reported in the journal Gastroentereology. Louis Weinstein, the treating physician, wrote that "Immunologic incompetence, related to either disease or therapy, or both ... although suspected, could not be proved..."
 By the end of the year December 31, 337 people are known to have had the disease, 321 adults, and 16 children under the age of 13 and of those 130 had died from the disease.

1982
 January, the service organization Gay Men's Health Crisis is founded by Larry Kramer and others in New York City.
 June 18, "Exposure to some substance (rather than an infectious agent) may eventually lead to immunodeficiency among a subset of the homosexual male population that shares a particular style of life." For example, Marmor et al. recently reported that exposure to amyl nitrite was associated with an increased risk of KS in New York City. Exposure to inhalant sexual stimulants, central-nervous-system stimulants, and a variety of other "street" drugs was common among males belonging to the cluster of cases of KS and PCP in Los Angeles and Orange counties."
 July 4, Terry Higgins becomes one of the first people to die of AIDS-related illnesses in the United Kingdom, prompting the foundation in November of what was to become the Terrence Higgins Trust.
 July 9, The CDC reports a cluster of opportunistic infections (OI) and Kaposi's sarcoma among Haitians recently entering the United States. Their risk factor for acquiring the syndrome was uncertain. Ten (29.4%) of these 34 patients with the syndrome of unexplained OI and Kaposi's Sarcoma (termed AIDS weeks later by CDC) also had disseminated tuberculosis. This was the first reported association of tuberculosis with AIDS in a cluster of patients. The uncertain risk factor for AIDS among Haitians was ultimately explained mostly by heterosexual transmission.
 July 27, The term AIDS (acquired immune deficiency syndrome) is proposed at a meeting in Washington, D.C. of gay-community leaders, federal bureaucrats and the CDC to replace GRID (gay-related immune deficiency) as evidence showed it was not gay specific.
 Summer, First known case in Italy.
 September 24, The CDC defines a case of AIDS as a disease, at least moderately predictive of a defect in cell-mediated immunity, occurring in a person with no known cause for diminished resistance to that disease. Such diseases include KS, PCP, and serious OI. Diagnoses are considered to fit the case definition only if based on sufficiently reliable methods (generally histology or culture). Some patients who are considered AIDS cases on the basis of diseases only moderately predictive of cellular immunodeficiency may not actually be immunodeficient and may not be part of the current epidemic.
 December 10, a baby in California becomes ill in the first known case of contracting AIDS from a blood transfusion.
 First known case in Brazil.
 First known case in Canada.
 First known case in Australia, diagnosed at St Vincent's Hospital, Sydney.

1983
 January, Françoise Barré-Sinoussi, at the Pasteur Institute in Paris, isolates a retrovirus that kills T-cells from the lymph system of a gay AIDS patient. In the following months, she would find additional cases in gay men and people with hemophilia. This retrovirus would be called by several names, including LAV and HTLV-III before being named HIV in 1986.
 CDC National AIDS Hotline is established.
 March, United States Public Health Service (PHS or USPHS) issues donor screening guidelines. AIDS high-risk groups should not donate blood/plasma products.
 In March, AIDS Project Los Angeles is founded by Nancy Cole Sawaya, Matt Redman, Ervin Munro, and Max Drew
 First known case in Colombia, A female sexual worker from Cali was diagnosed with HIV in the Hospital Universitario de Cartagena
 First AIDS-related death occurs in Australia, in the city of Melbourne. The Hawke Labor government invests in a significant campaign that has been credited with ensuring Australia has one of the lowest HIV infection rates in the world.
 AIDS is diagnosed in Mexico for the first time. HIV can be traced in the country to 1981.
 The PCR (polymerase chain reaction) technique is developed by Kary Mullis; it is widely used in AIDS research.
 Within a few days of each other, the musicians Jobriath and Klaus Nomi become the first internationally known recording artists to die from AIDS-related illnesses.
 First known case in Portugal.

1984
 Around January, the first case of HIV infection in the Philippines was reported.
 Gaëtan Dugas passes away due to AIDS-related illnesses. He was a French-Canadian flight attendant who was falsely identified as patient 0 due to his central location and labeling as "patient O," as in the letter O, in a scientific study of 40 infected Americans from multiple U.S. cities.
 Roy Cohn is diagnosed with AIDS, but attempts to keep his condition secret while receiving experimental drug treatment.
 April 23, U.S. Health and Human Services Secretary Margaret Heckler announces at a press conference that an American scientist, Robert Gallo, has discovered the probable cause of AIDS: the retrovirus is subsequently named human immunodeficiency virus or HIV in 1986. She also declares that a vaccine will be available within two years.
 June 25, French philosopher Michel Foucault dies of AIDS in Paris. Following his death, AIDES was founded.
 September 6, First performance at Theatre Rhinoceros in San Francisco of The AIDS Show which runs for two years and is the subject of a 1986 documentary film of the same name.
 December 17, Ryan White was diagnosed with AIDS by a doctor performing a partial lung removal. White became infected with HIV from blood products that were administered to him on a regular basis as part of his treatment for hemophilia. When the public school that he attended, Western Middle School in Russiaville, Indiana, learned of his disease in 1985 there was enormous pressure from parents and faculty to bar him from school premises. Due to the widespread fear of AIDS and lack of medical knowledge, principal Ron Colby and the school board assented. His family filed a lawsuit, seeking to overturn the ban.
 First known cases in Ecuador.

1985
 March 2, the FDA approves an ELISA test as the first commercially available test for detecting HIV in blood. It detects antibodies which the body makes in response to exposure to HIV and is first intended for use on all donated blood and plasma intended for transfusion and product manufacture.
 April 21, the play The Normal Heart by Larry Kramer premieres in New York City.
 July 28, AIDS Project Los Angeles hosts the world's first AIDS Walk at Paramount Studios in Hollywood. More than 4,500 people helped the Walk surpass its $100,000 goal, raising $673,000.
 September 17, during his second term in office, US President Ronald Reagan publicly mentions AIDS for the first time when asked about the lack of medical research funding by an AP reporter during a press conference.
 September 19, The first Commitment to Life is held in Los Angeles. Elizabeth Taylor hosted the event and honored former First Lady Betty Ford. Taylor said at the event "Tonight is the start of my personal war on this disease, AIDS." The event raised more than $1 million for AIDS Project Los Angeles.
 October 2, Rock Hudson dies of AIDS. On July 25, 1985, he was the first American celebrity to publicly admit having AIDS; he had been diagnosed with it on June 5, 1984.
 October 12, Ricky Wilson, guitarist of American rock band The B-52's dies from an AIDS related illness. The album Bouncing Off The Satellites, which he was working on when he died, is dedicated to him when it is released the next year. The band is devastated by the loss and do not tour or promote the album. Wilson is eventually replaced on guitar by his former writing partner Keith Strickland, the B-52's former drummer.
 October, a conference of public health officials including representatives of the Centers for Disease Control and World Health Organization meet in Bangui and define AIDS in Africa as "prolonged fevers for a month or more, weight loss of over 10% and prolonged diarrhea".
 First officially reported cases in China.
 November 11, An Early Frost, the first film to cover the topic of HIV/AIDS is broadcast in the U.S. on prime time TV by NBC.
 First known case in Cuba.

1986

 HIV (human immunodeficiency virus) is adopted as name of the retrovirus that was first proposed as the cause of AIDS by Luc Montagnier of France, who named it LAV (lymphadenopathy associated virus) and Robert Gallo of the United States, who named it HTLV-III (human T-lymphotropic virus type III)
 January 14, "one million Americans have already been infected with the virus and that this number will jump to at least 2 million or 3 million within 5 to 10 years..." – NIAID Director Anthony Fauci, The New York Times.
 February, US President Reagan instructs his Surgeon General C. Everett Koop to prepare a report on AIDS. (Koop was excluded from the Executive Task Force on AIDS established in 1983 by his immediate superior, Assistant Secretary of Health Edward Brandt.) Without allowing Reagan's domestic policy advisers to review the report, Koop released the report at a press conference on October 22, 1986.
 May 30, fashion designer Perry Ellis dies of AIDS-related illness.
 Attorney Geoffrey Bowers is fired from the firm of Baker & McKenzie after AIDS-related Kaposi's sarcoma lesions appeared on his face. The firm maintained that he was fired purely for his performance. He sued the firm, in one of the first AIDS discrimination cases to go to a public hearing. These events were the inspiration for the 1993 film Philadelphia.
 August 2, Roy Cohn dies of complications from AIDS at the age of 59. He insists to the end that his disease was liver cancer.
 November 18, model Gia Carangi dies of AIDS-related illness.
 First officially known cases in the Soviet Union. and India.

1987
 AZT (zidovudine), the first antiretroviral drug, becomes available to treat HIV.
 On February 4, popular performing musician Liberace dies from AIDS related illness.
 March 1, 1987, Dr. Peter Duesberg of the University of California, Berkeley publishes a 22-page peer-reviewed article "Retroviruses as Carcinogens and Pathogens: Expectations and Reality". The article challenges the hypothesis that HIV causes AIDS, launching the "AIDS denialist movement"
 In April the FDA approves a Western blot test as a more precise test for the presence of HIV antibodies than the ELISA test.'
 In March, the direct action advocacy group ACT UP is founded by Larry Kramer in New York City.
 On May 28, playwright and performer Charles Ludlam dies of AIDS-related PCP pneumonia.
 On July 2, musical theatre director, writer, choreographer, and dancer Michael Bennett dies of AIDS-related lymphoma at the age of 44.
 On July 11, Tom Waddell, founder of the Gay Games, dies of AIDS.
 Randy Shilts' investigative journalism book And the Band Played On published chronicling the 1980–1985 discovery and spreading of HIV/AIDS, government indifference, and political infighting in the United States to what was initially perceived as a gay disease. (Shilts died of the disease on February 17, 1994.)
 On August 18 the FDA sanctioned the first clinical trial to test an HIV vaccine candidate in a research participant.
 First known case in Nicaragua.

1988
 May, C. Everett Koop sends an eight-page, condensed version of his Surgeon General's Report on Acquired Immune Deficiency Syndrome report named Understanding AIDS to all 107,000,000 households in the United States, becoming the first federal authority to provide explicit advice to US citizens on how to protect themselves from AIDS.
 March 3, John Holmes dies from AIDS-related complications.
 August 5, screenwriter, actor, director, and producer Colin Higgins dies of an AIDS-related illness at his home at the age of 47.
 November 11, The fact-based AIDS-themed film Go Toward the Light is broadcast on CBS.
 December 1, The first World AIDS Day takes place.
 In Buenos Aires, Argentina, the rock musicians Miguel Abuelo (March 26) and Federico Moura (December 21), die from AIDS-related complications.
 American disco singer Sylvester dies of AIDS in San Francisco.

1989
 The television movie The Ryan White Story airs. It stars Judith Light as Jeanne, Lukas Haas as Ryan and Nikki Cox as sister Andrea. Ryan White had a small cameo appearance as Chad, a young patient with AIDS. Another AIDS-themed film, The Littlest Victims, debuted in 1989, biographically chronicling James Oleske, the first U.S. physician to discover AIDS in newborns during AIDS' early years, when many thought it was only spreading through male-to-male sexual activity.
 "Covering the Plague" by James Kinsella is published, providing a scathing look into how the media fumbled the AIDS story.
 British travel writer Bruce Chatwin dies from AIDS-related complications.
 NASCAR driver Tim Richmond dies from AIDS-related complications.
 Amanda Blake, best known for her portrayal of saloon owner Miss Kitty on the television show Gunsmoke, becomes the first actress of note in the United States to die of AIDS-related illness on August 16. The cause of death was cardiac arrest stemming from CMV hepatitis, an AIDS-related hepatitis.
 Longtime Companion is a 1989 film directed by Norman René and starring Bruce Davison, Campbell Scott, Patrick Cassidy, and Mary-Louise Parker. The first wide-release theatrical film to deal with the subject of AIDS, the film takes its title from the euphemism The New York Times used during the 1980s to describe the surviving same-sex partner of someone who had died of AIDS.
 New York's highest court ruled in Braschi vs. Stahl Associates that Miguel Braschi, a surviving gay partner of Leslie Blanchard who died of AIDS in 1986, had the right to continue living in their rent controlled apartment. The landlord's losing argument was that Miguel Braschi was not family because he was not related to Blanchard by "blood, marriage or adoption." The decision marked the first time any top state court in the nation recognized a gay couple to be the legal equivalent of a family, American Civil Liberties Union lawyer William Rubenstein said. The decision was a ground-breaking victory for lesbians and gay men; it marked an important step forward in American law toward legal recognition of lesbian and gay relationships.
 Judge Elizabeth A. Kovachevich of the United States District Court for the Middle District of Florida ruled that Eliana Martínez, who had AIDS, could sit at a desk in a classroom without isolation partitions; Martínez attended her first day of school on April 27, 1989.

1990s 

 1990
 January 6, British actor Ian Charleson dies from AIDS at the age of 40—the first show-business death in the United Kingdom openly attributed to complications from AIDS.
 February 16, New York artist and social activist Keith Haring dies from AIDS-related illness.
 April 8, Ryan White dies at the age of 18 from pneumonia caused by complications associated with AIDS.
 Congress enacted The Ryan White Comprehensive AIDS Resources Emergency (CARE) Act or Ryan White Care Act, the United States' largest federally funded health related program (excluding Medicaid and Medicare).
 July 7, Brazilian singer Cazuza dies in Rio de Janeiro at the age of 32 from an AIDS-related illness.
 November 9, American singer-songwriter Tom Fogerty, rhythm guitarist of Creedence Clearwater Revival and older brother of John Fogerty, dies in Berkeley, California of AIDS-related tuberculosis.

1991
 April, the Pediatric AIDS Clinical Trials Group (ACTG) of the US NIAID and the National Institute of Health and Medical Research (INSERM) and the National Agency of Research on AIDS (ANRS), France start the famous clinical trial of zidovudine (AZT) in HIV-infected pregnant women named "ACTG protocol 076". The trial shows such a big reduction in the risk for HIV transmission to the infant that it was halted prematurely in 1993 and later became the standard of care.
 May, the play Angels in America: A Gay Fantasia on National Themes by Tony Kushner premieres in San Francisco.
 September 28, jazz legend Miles Davis dies at the age of 65. The official cause of death is bronchial pneumonia. He was taking Zidovudine (AZT) when hospitalized; at the time, Zidovudine was a treatment for HIV and AIDS.
 November 7, NBA star Magic Johnson publicly announces that he is HIV-positive.
 November 24, A little over 24 hours after issuing a statement confirming that he had been tested HIV positive and had AIDS, Freddie Mercury (singer of the British band Queen) dies at the age of 45. The official cause of death is bronchial pneumonia resulting from AIDS.

1992
 The first combination drug therapies for HIV are introduced.
 April 6, popular science fiction writer Isaac Asimov dies. Ten years later, his wife revealed that his death was due to AIDS-related complications. The writer was infected during a blood transfusion in 1983.
 Robert Reed, best known as Mike Brady on the sitcom The Brady Bunch dies of AIDS on May 12.
 June 18, Australian singer Peter Allen dies from complications due to AIDS.
 September 12, American actor Anthony Perkins, known for his role as Norman Bates in the Psycho movies, dies from AIDS.
 Denholm Elliott, best known as Marcus Brody on the Indiana Jones film series. dies of AIDS related tuberculosis on October 22, 1992.
 At the Royal Free Hospital in London, an out-patients' centre for HIV and AIDS is opened by Ian McKellen. It is named the Ian Charleson Day Centre after actor Ian Charleson.
 Leanza Cornett becomes the first Miss America to adopt AIDS awareness as her platform for her year of service.

1993
 Rudolf Nureyev, one of the world's greatest ballet dancers, dies from AIDS on January 6.
 February 6 - Tennis star Arthur Ashe dies from AIDS-related complications.

1994
 Randy Shilts author of And the Band Played On: Politics, People, and the AIDS Epidemic, dies at his home of AIDS related complications.
 Elizabeth Glaser, wife of Starsky & Hutch Paul Michael Glaser, dies from AIDS-related complications almost 10 years after receiving an infected blood transfusion while giving birth. She unknowingly passes HIV on to her daughter Ariel and son Jake. Ariel died in 1988, Jake is living with HIV, while Paul Michael remains negative.
 Sarah Jane Salazar, a 19-year-old Filipino AIDS activist and educator, publicly admits she contracted HIV from a foreign customer while working as a club entertainer in the early 1990s. She was the second Filipino to do so. The first was Dolzura Cortez.
 March 21, actor Dack Rambo dies of AIDS related complications. He was one of the first actors in Hollywood to publicly acknowledge being HIV positive. He retired from acting and spent the remainder of his life raising awareness about AIDS.

1995
 Saquinavir, a new type of protease inhibitor drug, becomes available to treat HIV. Highly active antiretroviral therapy (HAART) becomes possible. Within two years, death rates due to AIDS will have plummeted in the developed world.
 March 26, Rapper Eazy-E dies from AIDS-related pneumonia.
 April 4, British DJ and entertainer Kenny Everett dies from AIDS.
 Oakland, California resident Jeff Getty becomes the first person to receive a bone marrow transplant from a Baboon as an experimental procedure to treat his HIV infection. The graft did not take, but Getty experienced some reduction in symptoms before dying of heart failure after cancer treatment in 2006.

1996
 Robert Gallo's discovery that some natural compounds known as chemokines can block HIV and halt the progression of AIDS is hailed by Science as one of that year's most important scientific breakthroughs.
 HIV resistance due to the CCR5-Δ32 discovered. CCR5-Δ32 (or CCR5-D32 or CCR5 delta 32) is an allele of CCR5.
 Brazilian Law No. 9313, enacted on November 13, 1996, provided every Brazilian with the HIV virus the right to free medication.
 Cynthia Culpeper became the first pulpit rabbi to announce being diagnosed with AIDS, which she did while she was rabbi of Agudath Israel in Montgomery, Alabama.

1997
 September 2, The Washington Post carries an article stating, "The most recent estimate of the number of Americans infected (with HIV), 750,000, is only half the total that government officials used to cite over a decade ago, at a time when experts believed that as many as 1.5 million people carried the virus."
 Based on the Bangui definition the WHO's cumulative number of reported AIDS cases from 1980 through 1997 for all of Africa is 620,000. For comparison, the cumulative total of AIDS cases in the USA through 1997 is 641,087.
 December 7, "French President Jacques Chirac addressed Africa's top AIDS conference on Sunday and called on the world's richest nations to create an AIDS therapy support fund to help Africa. According to Chirac, Africa struggles to care for two-thirds of the world's persons with AIDS without the benefit of expensive AIDS therapies. Chirac invited other countries, especially European nations, to create a fund that would help increase the number of AIDS studies and experiments. AIDS workers welcomed Chirac's speech and said they hoped France would promote the idea to the Group of Eight summit of the world's richest nations."

1998
 December 10, International Human Rights Day, Treatment Action Campaign (TAC) is launched to campaign for greater access to HIV treatment for all South Africans, by raising public awareness and understanding about issues surrounding the availability, affordability and use of HIV treatments. TAC campaigns against the view that AIDS is a death sentence.

1999
 January 31, Studies suggest that a retrovirus, SIVcpz (simian immunodeficiency virus) from the common chimpanzee Pan troglodytes, may have passed to human populations in west equatorial Africa during the twentieth century and developed into various types of HIV.
 Edward Hooper releases a book titled The River, which accuses doctors who developed and administered the oral polio vaccine in 1950s Africa of unintentionally starting the AIDS epidemic. The OPV AIDS hypothesis receives a great deal of publicity. It was later refuted by studies demonstrating the origins of HIV as a mutated variant of a simian immunodeficiency virus that is lethal to humans. Hooper's hypothesis should not be confused with the Heart of Darkness origin theory.

2000s
2000
 World Health Organization estimates between 15% and 20% of new HIV infections worldwide are the result of blood transfusions, where the donors were not screened or inadequately screened for HIV.
 February 23, Israeli singer Ofra Haza died in Tel Aviv of AIDS-related pneumonia.
 June 11, Sarah Jane Salazar died at the age of 25 from AIDS complications. Before her death, Salazar was confined at the National Center for Mental Health after being diagnosed with manic depression which doctors said may have been related to anti-AIDS drugs she was taking.

2001
 September 21, FDA licenses the first nucleic acid test (NAT) systems intended for screening of blood and plasma donations.

 2002
 The Food and Drug Administration (FDA) approves the first rapid diagnostic HIV test kit for use in the United States. The kit has a 99.6% accuracy and can provide results in as little as twenty minutes. The test kit can be used at room temperature, did not require specialized equipment, and can be used outside of clinics and doctor's offices. The mobility and speed of the test allowed a wider spread use of HIV testing.

2003
 US President George W. Bush initiates the President's Emergency Plan for AIDS Relief. By the time he leaves office it provides medicine for two million Africans.

2004
 January 5, "Individual risk of acquiring HIV and experiencing rapid disease progression is not uniform within populations," says Anthony S. Fauci, the director of NIAID. 

2005
 January 21, The CDC recommends anti-retroviral post-exposure prophylaxis for people exposed to HIV from rapes, accidents or occasional unsafe sex or drug use. This treatment should start no more than 72 hours after a person has been exposed to the virus, and the drugs should be used by patients for 28 days. This emergency drug treatment had been recommended since 1996 for health-care workers accidentally stuck with a needle, splashed in their eyes with blood, or exposed in some other work-related way.
 A highly resistant strain of HIV linked to rapid progression to AIDS is identified in New York City.
2006
 November 9, SIV found in gorillas.

2007
 The first case of someone being cured of HIV is reported. Timothy Ray Brown is a San Francisco man, with leukemia and HIV. He is cured of HIV through a bone marrow transplant in Germany from a homozygous CCR5-Δ32 donor. Other similar cases are being studied to confirm similar results.
 Maraviroc, the first available CCR5 receptor antagonist, is approved by the FDA as an antiviral drug for the treatment of AIDS.

2010s
2010
 Confirmation is published that the first patient cured of HIV, Timothy Ray Brown, still has a negative HIV status, four years after treatment.

2012
 The Food and Drug Administration (FDA) approves Truvada for pre-exposure prophylaxis (PrEP). The drug can be taken by adults who do not have HIV, but are at risk for the disease. People can now take this medication to reduce their risk for contracting the virus through sexual activity.

2013
 Confirmation is published that a toddler has been "functionally cured" of HIV infection. However, in 2014, it was announced that the child had relapsed and that the virus had re-appeared.
 A New York Times article says that 12 people of 75 who began combination antiretroviral therapy soon after becoming infected may have been "functionally cured" of HIV according to a French study. A functionally cured person will not experience an increase of the virus in the bloodstream despite stopping antiretroviral therapy, and therefore not progress to AIDS.

2014
 Former International AIDS Society president Joep Lange and other HIV/AIDS researchers were killed in the Malaysia Airlines Flight 17 in July.

2015
 A new, aggressive strain of HIV discovered in Cuba Researchers at the University of Leuven in Belgium say the HIV strain CRF19 can progress to AIDS within two to three years of exposure to virus. Typically, HIV takes approximately 10 years to develop into AIDS. The researchers found that patients with the CRF19 variant had more virus in their blood than patients who had more common strains. Patients with CRF19 may start getting sick before they even know they have been infected, which ultimately means there is a significantly shorter time span to stop the disease's progression. The researchers suspect that fragments of other subsets of the virus fasten to each other through an enzyme which makes the virus more powerful and more easily replicated in the body, thus the faster progression.

2016
 Researchers have found that an international study found that almost 2,000 patients with HIV failed to respond to the antiviral drug known as Tenofovir disoproxil. Tenofovir is the main HIV drug treatment. The failure to respond to treatment indicates that the virus' resistance to the medication is becoming increasingly common.
 The United Nations holds its 2016 High-Level Meeting on Ending AIDS. The countries involved, the member states of the United Nations, pledge to end the AIDS epidemic by 2030. There was significant controversy surrounding the event as over 50 countries blocked the access of LGBTQ+ groups from participating in the meeting. At the conclusion of the meetings, which ran from June 8 to 10, 2016, the final resolution barely mentioned several groups that are most affected by HIV/AIDS: men who have sex with men, transgender people, people who inject drugs, and sex workers.
2019
 A second patient is reported to be cured of HIV/AIDS using the same cell therapy approach that cured the first patient of HIV/AIDS, removing doubts that the first instance of the cure was a fluke and providing clinical proof that a cure for HIV/AIDS is both possible and repeatable.
 Research Foundation to Cure AIDS (RFTCA) becomes the first 501(c)3 public charity in the United States with a grant to its own biotechnology to research, develop and commercialize a cure for HIV/AIDS on a pro bono basis.
 NIH, in collaboration with Bill & Melinda Gates Foundation, launches a $200 million commitment to fund efforts focused on curing HIV infection and sickle cell disease. The announcement comes shortly before the first cases of the SARS-CoV-2 coronavirus/COVID-19 pandemic.

2020s

2020 

 COVID-19 pandemic

2021 

 The United Nations held the 2021 high-level meeting on HIV/AIDS.

2022 

 City of Hope doctors announced that a fourth person in history has been cured of HIV through a stem cell transplant. The patient had cancer, of which he has also been cured. But the doctors warned the procedure cannot be made available on a large scale.

See also 
 History of HIV/AIDS
 Timeline of early HIV/AIDS cases

References

Further reading

External links 
 Interactive zoomable timeline focusing on the last 30 years and the AIDS Memorial Quilt
 Important milestones in the U.S. HIV/AIDS epidemic
 Flash Global HIV/AIDS Timeline from the Kaiser Family Foundation

AIDS
History of HIV/AIDS
Infectious disease-related lists

fr:Syndrome d'immunodéficience acquise#Histoire